Michael Kelvin Norris (born March 19, 1955) is a former Major League Baseball right-handed starting pitcher who played with the Oakland Athletics (–).

Career
He attended Balboa High School in San Francisco and was drafted by the Oakland A's in the first round (24th overall) 
In January 1973. He made his major league debut in 1975.

Norris is best remembered for his spectacular  season. He went 22-9 with 24 complete games and a 2.53 earned run average, while also earning the Gold Glove Award. However, he was not awarded the American League Cy Young Award; Steve Stone of the Baltimore Orioles, who had a record of 25-7, was given the honor. Norris also placed 15th in the MVP voting.

In , Norris posted a modest 12-9 record, again earning the Gold Glove Award and also earning an All-Star berth he was denied in 1980. Norris spun a complete game shutout in the first round of the playoffs against the Kansas City Royals and pitched well in the AL Championship Series against the New York Yankees despite getting hit with a loss there.

However, Norris never even approached his 1981 form again. A number of baseball historians and statisticians have blamed this on manager Billy Martin overworking him and the other members of the 1981 staff. In 2006, baseball writer Rob Neyer estimated that Norris threw 131 pitches per complete game in 1981–a heavy workload for a young pitcher even then. He was sent to the minors during the 1983 season. After spending parts of the next five years in the minors, he made a brief comeback as a relief pitcher in 1990, posting an ERA of 3.00 in 27 innings. He is the only player to win at least one game with Oakland in three different decades.

In 1999 he was diagnosed with cervical myelopathy, and he had surgery in January 2000 at the California Pacific Medical Center. After recovering, Norris took up golf as a hobby. In 2007, he appeared with Dave Stewart, Mudcat Grant, and Vida Blue in a pre-game ceremony before a regular season game between the Texas Rangers and the Oakland Athletics.

Norris was well known for his distinctive green fielding glove.

See also

List of Major League Baseball players who spent their entire career with one franchise

References

External links

Pura Pelota (Venezuelan Winter League)

1955 births
Living people
Acereros de Monclova players
American expatriate baseball players in Canada
American expatriate baseball players in Mexico
American League All-Stars
African-American baseball players
Baseball players from San Francisco
Birmingham A's players
Burlington Bees players
City College of San Francisco Rams baseball players
Gold Glove Award winners
Huntsville Stars players
Jersey City A's players
Major League Baseball pitchers
Mexican League baseball pitchers
Modesto A's players
Navegantes del Magallanes players
American expatriate baseball players in Venezuela
Oakland Athletics players
Reno Silver Sox players
San Bernardino Pride players
San Jose Bees players
San Jose Missions players
Tacoma Tigers players
Tucson Toros players
Vancouver Canadians players
21st-century African-American people
20th-century African-American sportspeople